The works of Nathaniel Hitch enumerates the types of projects that Nathaniel Hitch was involved in over the course of his career, roughly from 1871 to 1935.

Hitch ran his own business, first as a sole worker and later with hired employees to assist in the execution of work. Most of his work came through business relationships that he had with architects. John Loughborough Pearson provided commissions for Hitch over the course of his career, providing more than 75% of his work.

Notable works

All Saints' Church in Hove, Sussex
All Saints Church in Hove, Sussex, commissioned by the Reverend Thomas Peacey, was designed by John Loughborough Pearson but actually built with the assistance of his son Frank. Churches’s work here is arguably some of his best and the carving on the reredos and the bishop's throne is of the very highest standard. Pevsner described the reredos as "sumptuously carved." Churtch also carved the sedilia.

Beverley Minster
The original reredos and altar screen at Beverley Minster was erected in the reign of Edward III between c. 1320 and 1340. At the time of the dissolution of the Beverley College of Secular Canons in 1547, the eastern face of the screen remained nearly as it was when built but the statuary on the western front was demolished and much of the carving mutilated. All that remained was covered over with plaster upon which was painted the Commandments, the Lord's Prayer and the Apostles' Creed. In 1825–26 the reredos was rebuilt by Mr. Comins, the master mason, but this reconstruction fell short of filling the 12 niches and decorating the 36 panels. In 1897, and to John Loughborough Pearson’s designs, Hitch carved twelve statues for the screen, this due to the generosity of Canon Nolloth who put up the required funds. Nolloth also funded completion of the thirty six panels which were filled by opus sectile mosaic by Messrs. Powell. Several photographs of Hitch’s work are shown below courtesy of John Phillips of the Friends of Beverley Minster.

The Black Friar

John Betjeman declared the public house the Black Friar to be "the most perfect art nouveau in London" and this public house designed by Herbert Fuller-Clark, boasts sculptural work by Hitch, Frederick T Callcot, Henry Poole and E.J. and A.T. Bradford. It dates back to around 1875 but it was Alfred Pettitt, who was the publican there in the first quarter of the twentieth century, who commissioned a total make-over. Pettitt called in H. Fuller-Clark and he was to transform the building!   Hitch and Callcott worked on the first phase of the building's decoration in around 1905 with Hitch carving a series of stone grotesques on the exterior and similar work in wood for the interior. The second phase started in 1917 and now Hitch carved in oak a relief featuring music making monkeys for the bracket for the clock with the motto "Tones Make the Music" and also carved the tiny capitals, with the names of drinks and other mottoes on them, in the simulated window embrasure of the niche or snug. The two monkeys forming the clock bracket play viola de gamba and horn. There are ten of the miniature capitals, each one illustrating a word or phrase: "Rum Punch" "Food", etc.

In the exterior grotesques shown below Hitch amusingly carves two imps blowing horns, two others dancing to their music. We have a friar feeding pie to an ass, a friar cutting into a cheese watched by two starvelings, a friar sitting on a barrel and singing to the accompaniment of two grotesque instrumentalists. We have a group of grotesque musicians, gnomes carrying lanterns and gnomes singing. Frederick T Callcott completed some copper sculptures for the pub’s interior: "Carols, flanked by Summer and Winter"/"Tomorrow will be Friday"/"Saturday Afternoon"/"Friar with Hour Glass and Friar preparing to boil an egg" with further work of this nature being added by Henry Poole: " A good thing is soon snatched away"/"Don’t advertise, tell it to a gossip"/"Contentment surpasses Riches" and " Four Imps representing Art, Literature, Music and Drama". Poole also created some hanging lamps and some ceiling reliefs . E.J. and A.T Bradford added several keystones and capitals illustrating Aesop's Fables and various nursery rhymes.

Buller Memorial

William Douglas Caröe designed the Memorial to General Sir Redvers Buller VC in The Collegiate Church of the Holy Cross and the Mother of Him who Hung Thereon in Crediton, Devon and Hitch carved the sculpture of St George which forms part of that memorial.

Church of the Holy Spirit, Clapham
For the Church of the Holy Spirit in Clapham, South London, Hitch carried out a series of carvings for the oak choir stalls and chancel screen. The church was built between 1912 and 1913 and has a Grade II listing. It was designed by Henry Philip Burke Downing in the Gothic style. Hitch also worked on an oak rood with Our Lady and St John on either side of Our Lord and an ornate Bishop’s Chair or Throne with the arms of the then newly created Diocese of Southwark on the back. The carved lettering on the chancel screen involves quotations from the "Benedicite" and "Te Deum". Outside the church, Hitch carved a statue of Christ instituting Holy Communion and also carved the crucifix on the Burke Downing designed war memorial.

New College Chapel, Oxford
John Loughborough Pearson designed the upper section of the huge reredos in New College Chapel, Oxford and Nathaniel Hitch did all the figural work. This reredos replaced one in stucco dating from 1789 by Wyatt.

The reredos has five tiers of figures and at the bottom some marble reliefs by Westmacott. In the immaculately kept New College Archives are a series of sepia photographs of Hitch’s figures taken before they were sent from his workshop near Vauxhall to Oxford and in the archive's record 3140 are letters dated between 1883 and 1892 relating to the reredos and these include several letters written by Hitch himself. Some of these letters show the lengths to which Hitch went to ensure that his statues were true to life. In the instance of the statue of William of Wykeham we read how a mask was made of the Winchester effigy of William of Wykeham and then sent to Hitch so that he could be sure that he achieved an accurate likeness. In looking at the relationship between architect/designer and sculptor one is sometimes struck by the way in which the architect/designer received credit for a particular work with the sculptor very often getting little or no mention and one letter written by Hitch shows that this did matter to him. In this letter he thanks the addressee for sending him a newspaper cutting, one assumes about the reredos, and notes "They name the architect I notice but not the sculptor." We also learn from these letters of the great care taken in the detail of each of the individual statues. "St Peter carries the keys", "James Minor a club" and "Simon a saw" etc. etc. A photograph of the complete reredos is shown below, another shows some of Hitch's carvings and a close-up of the statue of Moses complete with tablet and horns gives us a good idea of Hitch's ability as a mason.

In 1891 Hitch made statues for a stone sedilia and large stone screen.

Parish Church of Woodham, Surrey

Hitch carved the church's pulpit and completed the figural work for the reredos in the Parish church of Woodham in Surrey. The pulpit is on the north side of the Nave arch and is carved from oak. It was dedicated on Sunday 26 October 1913 by the Archdeacon of Surrey. The reredos was designed in early 14th Century Gothic style by the Reverend Ernest Geldart and was executed in 1915 in Corsham stone from Corsham quarries and was dedicated in 1915. At the time of dedication only the central panel was complete and the niches were unoccupied, but at rapid intervals the figures were completed and the reredos was dedicated by the vicar on Easter Eve 15 April 1922. An aumbury and arcading on the north wall was added in 1918 and the work completed in 1921. Again Hitch did all the carving involved. The central panel of the reredos is surmounted by a canopy in carved stone and contains a representation of Our Lord as the everlasting Priest "after the order of Melchizedek " surrounded by Cherubs and bearing the sacramental Cup and Bread of Life. He stands upon an altar, from whence, beneath His feet, there issue the Four Rivers of the Gospel. On either side, kneeling angels adore Him and offer incense, which the Prophet says should accompany the "Pure Offering" in every place. On the base of the pedestal are carved the words from the Te Deum- "Tu Rex Gloria Christe" (Thou art the king of Glory, O Christ). The statues inserted in the niches and the wall panels complete the theme of the reredos "ALL THY SAINTS GIVE THANKS TO THEE" for they represent saints of every age and all climes, including England. The evangelists are shown above the central niches, not in human form, but as the four living creatures revealed to St John in the Heavenly Vision:- the Angel of St Matthew, the Lion of St Mark, the Ox of St Luke, and the Eagle of St John. All bear scrolls inscribed with the first words of their gospels in Latin : - "Liber generationis Jesu Christi"; "Initium Evangelii Jesu Christi"; "Fuit in diebus herodis"; "In principio erat Verbum". The names of the sixteen saints represented and from North to South are St Francis of Assisi, St Hilda-Abbess, St Helena- matron, St Edward the Confessor-King, St Swithun-Confessor, Venerable Bede-Confessor, St Paul-Apostle, St Peter- Apostle, St Stephen-Martyr, St George-Martyr, St Jerome-Doctor, St Augustine of Hippo-Doctor, St Columba-Missionary, St Faith- Virgin, St Etheldreda-Queen and Abbess and St Hugh of Lincoln-Abbot. Special interest attaches to the figure of St Swithun as he carries a small model of Winchester Cathedral. St Swithun, the friend and educator of Alfred the Great was Bishop of Winchester A. D. 860, and in the "Bededictional of St Ethelworld" (a magnificently illuminated manuscript, formally one of the Treasures of the Chapter and now in the British Library), there is a drawing of the cathedral showing the columns and capitals, the roof with its red tiles and above it the golden weathercock. By kind permission of the dean a tracing was made of the copy given to the Chapter by the Duke of Westminster, the then owner and from this a drawing was made which Hitch followed for his sculpture. Hitch also carried out the carving on the front altar in the Lady Chapel. The central panel represents the moment of the presentation of the Holy Child in the Temple. Simeon is holding the child, while Mary is kneeling in an attitude of deep devotion and St Joseph is standing a little behind with his head inclined in prayer. On each side are panels with carved lilies with their leaves open. A photograph is shown here of Hitch’s carving of "Our Lord as the Everlasting Priest", part of the reredos.

St David's Church, Exeter

Working with William Douglas Caröe, Hitch undertook the figural carving for the reredos and choir stalls. In M.G. Smith's booklet he states that Caröe
persuaded Nathaniel Hitch of London, probably the best "Gothic" carver in the country at that time, one who had collaborated with Caröe in furnishing St John’s Mountfitchett, to undertake the figure carving in the reredos and choir stalls, though the rest of the wood carving was done by local craftsmen."

The carvings on the Choir Stalls include important figures in the Church:

 Niches on the south side dealing with Praise and Hymns depict Ephraim of Edessa who represents the hymn writers of the Ancient Church of Syria and in another niche Gregory of Nazianzus who represents Greek hymn-writers. In another is Ambrose, "father of Church song," the Ambrosian Chant, who introduced from the East the practice of Antiphonal Chanting.
 In the Boy’s Stalls on the south side are four kneeling figures of writers from among English Bishops. We have Ken once the rector of Brightstone on the Isle of Wight and author of "Awake my soul and with the sun" and "Glory to Thee, my God this night". We then have Heber, Bishop of Calcutta, who wrote "From Greenland’s icy mountains.", "The Son of God goes forth to war" and "Holy, Holy, Holy, Lord God Almighty.". We are then reminded of Walsham How, Bishop of Wakefield, author of "O Jesu, Thou art standing.", " For all the saints who from their labours rest." and "We give Thee but Thine own" and finally we have Bickersteth, Bishop of Exeter, who wrote "Peace, perfect peace." and "Till He come."
 In the Stalls on the north side the carvings deal with "Liturgical Prayer." Leo, Gelasius and Gregory, Bishops of Rome in 440, 492 and 549 were believed to have written important Sacramentaries. These Roman Sacramentaries are divided into three classes, the Leonian, Gelasian and Gregorian.
 Further kneeling figures in the Boys' Stalls are Osmund, who wrote the "Sarum Missal.", Archbishop Cranmer, head of the revising Committee by whom the First Prayer Book of Edward VI was issued in 1549, Cosin, Bishop of Durham, composer of the Collects for 3rd Sunday in Advent, 6th Sunday after Epiphany and Easter Eve who did invaluable work on the final revision of the Prayer Book in 1661, Andrewes, Chaplain to Queen Elizabeth and Bishop of Winchester and author of "Manual of Devotion".
 On the front bench-ends are four large figures representing the "Sources of Christianity"- St Gregory and St Augustine represent the Roman Source of English Christianity and can be found on the South Side, whereas on the north side we have St Columba representing the Scotic source and St David.
 In front of the Choir Stalls the conversion of the Heptarchy is illustrated by carvings of six Kings and the Bishops to whom they and their people owed the introduction of Christianity. Ethelbert and Augustine/Edwin and Paulinus/Oswald and Aidan/Oswy and Chad/Kynegils and Birinus and Redwald and Felix.
 In front of the Priests' Stalls are four men associated with the organisation of the Church. There is Wilfrith, Theodore, Aldhelm and King Geruntius.

St Giles' Church, Bradford-on-Tone
For St Giles' Church in Bradford-on-Tone in Somerset and working with William Douglas Caröe, Hitch completed work on figures for a reredos, depicting the Evangelists Matthew, Mark, Luke and John. These figures stand in arched niches on either side of a central panel. They are bearded except for John and all wear gold cloaks over white tunics trimmed with gold and red. Each holds a quill pen in his right hand and a red book with a gold clasp in his left. They all wear red sandals. Matthew has a red purse suspended from his girdle and John a gold one.

Each of the four Evangelists is identified by his "attribute", carved beside him on his plinth and bearing a red sash with the saint’s name on it written in rustic capitals: a winged man, a winged lion, a winged ox and an eagle represent Matthew, Mark, Luke and John respectively. There is a nimbus behind the head of each saint. The saint’s niches are painted dark blue/green with a cinquefoil, gold edged, highlighted with red in the spandrels.

In the spandrels between each pair of saints, Matthew and Mark to the North, Luke and John to the South, is raised decoration painted gold, with stylised leaves, flowers and fruit, but different on each side. A gold ball of oak leaves and "bell-flowers" is found above and to the North and South of Matthew and Mark and a ball of oak leaves and vine leaves similarly above and to the North and South of Luke and John. These match the carvings on the cill of the aumbry in the North wall of the chancel. Above the niches there is blind tracery with a cusped lozenge design and above this a frieze of billets. More blind arcading with trefoil heads fills the wall between the niches and the floor.

St. Giles's Church, Haughton

Architect John Loughborough Pearson
In 1887, John Loughborough Pearson was charged with the reconstruction of St Giles’ Church in Haughton, Staffordshire. This reconstruction included a reredos in Caen stone and Hitch carried out all the carving for that reredos. Hitch also carved the pulpit in Caen Stone and with red marble shafts. The reredos consists of three panels.

The central panel shows the Transfiguration and we see Jesus with Peter, James and John. "Six days later Jesus took Peter and James and John the brother of James, and led them up a high mountain where they were alone; and in their presence he was transfigured; his face shone like the sun, and his clothes became white as the light." St Matthew 17. 1-3. A photograph of the central panel is shown below. All photographs including the pulpit and reredos shown courtesy of Michael Cooksley.

To the right and left of this central panel are eight smaller panels, these in groups of four. In the four panels on the left hand side are scenes from the Childhood of Jesus.

In the top panel first left, we see Mary and Joseph with Jesus lying in a manger. "After the angels had left them and gone into heaven, the shepherds said to one another 'Come we must go straight to Bethlehem and see this thing that has happened, which the Lord has made known to us' so they went with all speed and found their way to Mary and Joseph and the baby lying in a manger." St Luke 2.16

In the top panel second left we see Mary, Jesus and the Three Wise Men. "Entering the house, they saw the child with Mary his mother, and bowed to the ground in homage to him; then they opened their treasures and offered him gifts of gold, frankincense, and myrrh." St Matthew 2.11.

In the bottom panel first left we see Mary, Joseph and baby Jesus fleeing to Egypt. "So Joseph rose from sleep, and taking mother and child by night he went away with them to Egypt, and there he stayed until Herod’s death." St Matthew 2. 14,15.

In the bottom panel second left we see Jesus in the temple. "And after three days they found Jesus sitting in the temple surrounded by the teachers, listening to them and putting questions; and all who heard him were amazed at his intelligence and the answers he gave". St Luke 2. 46.47.

In the four panels on the right hand side are scenes from the Passion. In the first top right panel we see Jesus agonising in the garden of Gethsemane with the disciples asleep. Jesus had knelt down and prayed this prayer- " Father, if it be thy will, take this cup away from me; yet not my will but thine be done". And now there appeared to him an angel from heaven bringing him strength and in anguish of spirit he prayed the more urgently; and his sweat was like drops of blood falling to the ground. When he rose from prayer and came to the disciples he found them asleep, worn out by grief." St Luke 22.42-46.

In the top second right panel we see Jesus betrayed and arrested. "While he was still speaking a crowd appeared with a man called Judas, one of the twelve, at their head, He came up to Jesus to kiss him; but Jesus said. "Judas would you betray the Son of Man with a kiss? St Luke 22. 47-49.

In the bottom first right panel we see Caiaphas questioning Jesus. "Jesus was led off under arrest to the house of Caiaphas the High Priest, where the lawyers and elders were assembled. The chief priests and the whole of the Council tried to find some allegation against Jesus on which a death sentence could be based" St Matthew 26. 57-59.

In the bottom panel second right we see Jesus led away to be crucified. “Jesus was now taken in charge and, carrying his own cross, went out to the place of the skull, as it is called, (or in the Jews' language, Golgotha.).” St John 19.17.

When John Loughborough Pearson was completing his work in 1888 a statue of the "Good Shepherd" was put in a niche above the porch. Hitch carved this statue and a photograph is shown above.

Architect William Douglas Caröe
After John Loughborough Pearson’s death, William Douglas Caröe became the church architect and in 1910 he designed arches and arcades which were placed on either side of the central panels. They held figures of six martyrs and all six figures were carved by Hitch in Hollington stone.

Below are photographs of these figures. We have three from the Bible being Zechariah, the first martyr, St Stephen, the first Christian martyr, and St James, the first Apostolic martyr. Then there are three martyrs from church history, Polycarp, representing the early church, St Alban, the first British martyr and Archbishop Cranmer, the Reformation martyr.

In 1948 Hitch’s son, Frederick Brook Hitch sculpted a statue of St Giles which stands inside the church on a support for the tower. This was designed by Alban Caröe, William Douglas Caröe’s son.

St Margaret’s Church, Horsforth
For St Margaret’s Church in Horsforth in Yorkshire, Hitch did the figural work on the reredos. It was designed by Frank Loughborough Pearson and portrays the risen Lord triumphantly proclaiming the glorious truth of the resurrection. The figures in the top row are all of angels. From left to right, they are: The Angel of Passion with cross/Raphael, the Angel of Guidance with staff, water bottle and wallet/Michael, the Angel of Justice with sword and scales/Gabriel, the Angel of Purity with Lily/Uriel, the Angel of Light and the Angel of the Resurrection. There are also two angels in the centres of the side panels. The bottom figures are representations of the Patron Saints of the United Kingdom, of the Diocese of Ripon and Leeds and of St Margaret’s itself. From left to right, they are: St. George of England (in battle array)/St. Wilfrid (with bishop's mitre, crook and robes)/St. Andrew of Scotland (holding a model of the cross saltire on which he died) /St. Patrick of Ireland (with conquered serpents)/St. Margaret of Antioch (crowned, bible in hand and slain dragon at her feet) and St. David of Wales (with emblematic dove on his shoulder). The building of the full church had taken many years. The original designer of the church was John Loughborough Pearson and the nave and chancel were completed and dedicated in 1883 but the belfry, spire and porches were only dedicated in 1901. The dedication of the reredos came much later on 23 July 1911. As already stated the design was by John Loughborough Pearson’s son who also designed a reredos for the Lady Chapel.

St Mary's Church, Streatley
Hitch carved the alabaster reredos at St Mary's Church in Streatley to John Loughborough Pearson's design. He executed the work in 1893. The central panel shows the Crucifixion and on the left side of this is a scene from our Lord's childhood and on the right side the Resurrection. Between the panels and on either side are smaller statuettes, the four outer ones being the Evangelists Matthew, Mark, Luke and John. A statuette on the north side of the central panel is of Aaron and on the south side is Elias, the two representing priests and prophets. The reredos was erected in memory of Mrs. Stone, the then lady of the manor, and funded by the Stone family. Streatley and its neighbour Goring are pleasing little Oxfordshire villages and Streatley featured in Jerome K. Jerome's "Three Men in a Boat." Laurence Binyon the poet who wrote "For the Fallen" :"They shall grow not old, as we that are left grow old." lived in the Parish and Richard Adams wrote "Watership Down" when living in Streatley. Adams and his family were worshippers at St Mary. Photographs of the reredos are shown here and a full photograph of the reredos can be seen on the church’s website.

St Stephen's Church, Bournemouth
For St Stephen's Church, Bournemouth, Hitch did carvings on the marble pulpit, stalls, triptych and altar table in 1889 and in 1898 worked on the Altar Table and Triptych (reredos) based upon John Loughborough Pearson’s designs. The pulpit shows three scenes from the New Testament. In the centre Jesus is shown preaching the Sermon on the Mount to his disciples and at the sides we have St Peter preaching on the first Whitsunday (Pentecost) and St Paul preaching at Athens.

The triptych which towers above the altar has the crucified Jesus in the centre, with the Blessed Virgin and St John standing on either side. On the left is Elijah and his raven and on the right the Prophet Isaiah. On the left wing of the triptych are St Stephen and Moses and on the right we have St John the Baptist and David. Above are the figures of four bishops: St Ambrose, St Augustine, St Clement and St Swithun each of whom has had a church dedicated in their honour in Bournemouth. As it was Moses and Elijah who appeared with Jesus at his Transfiguration, Hitch has carved around the cross of Christ representatives of the Old Covenant and the New and Easterns and Westerns, all gathered in united adoration. See photograph of the reredos below.

The central panel of the High Altar shows the Adoration of the Magi and on the left the Annunciation of the Blessed Virgin Mary and on the right the Presentation of Christ in the Temple.

Hitch also carved the Altar in the Lady Chapel and the carvings on the choir stalls these to Frank Loughborough Pearson’s design. These are in Baltic oak and amongst the figures carved are St Cecilia, patron saint of music, St Catharine, who was martyred on a wheel, St Stephen and various other saints, martyrs and church leaders. The panels at the end of the pews show miracles performed by Jesus and parables told by Him.

Sidney Sussex College Chapel, Cambridge
Hitch carried out some figural sculpture for the Sidney Sussex College Chapel in Cambridge when it was refurbished by T.H. Lyon between 1911 and 1923. Hitch carved some figural roundels, a statue of St Francis and a statue of St George with the arms of Archbishop Machray supported by cherubs below. The figure of St Francis commemorated J.W. Reynolds who was killed in action in 1915. The non-figural carving in the Chapel was executed by Herbert Read of Exeter.

Truro Cathedral
Truro Cathedral (the Cathedral Church of St Mary in Truro)) is thought by many to be John Loughborough Pearson’s finest work. Hitch did much of the sculptural work in the Cathedral including the figural work on the reredos, carvings above the north and south sedilia, two tympanum for the south porch, some sculptures for the inside of the Cathedral, including the "Transfiguration of Christ" above the South Door and carvings to the choir stalls. Below we see the central panel showing the crucifixion and in the gallery we see two views of the carvings above the sedilia, a study of part of the central panel, one of the tympanum above the south porch and some of the side panels.

The reredos was carved from Bath stone and erected in 1887. In the lower of the two central panels we see Christ on the cross. His mother stands on His left and Mary Magdalene kisses His feet. St John stands on His right and we then have some Hebrew Rabbis and a group of Roman soldiers. One soldier carries the "INRI" inscription which will be placed at the head of the cross.

In the central panel above, the same Christ sits in glory. On either side of these two central panels are columns each with eight pairs of adoring Angels in niches. On each side of these central panels and columns are a series of further richly canopied niches in which are various relief carvings each relating to a biblical episode and thus making the reredos an effective instrument of teaching. There are four such panels on each side. In the top left panel we have the sacrifice of Abel, the first recorded sacrifice in the bible. Next we have Noah and his family offering a sacrifice of thanksgiving from some of the animals who had survived the flood with them. In the panel below is the sacrifice of Isaac and in the final panel we see the story of the Passover.

In the four right hand panels we have the Tree of Life in the Garden of Eden being defended by an angel, Moses' brazen serpent, the Shewbread and the gathering of the First Fruits. Then in the panels on the far right of the sanctuary screen and above the sedilia we have the Gathering of the Manna, and water flowing from the rock at Kadesh after Moses had struck it with his rod. There are further carvings on the right and left hand side of the sanctuary screen, and above the sedilia.

In the outer tiers of niches we see some of the prophets: Jeremiah, Joel, Zechariah and Malachi, with all but Zechariah carrying his name, are in the outer tier on the left hand side and Daniel, Amos, Isaiah and Ezekiel feature in the outer tier on the right hand side. Then in the inner tiers we have the Saints and Martyrs of the Christian Church. We have on one side, Edmund, the Christian King of the East Angles, defeated by the Vikings; Cecilia, patron of music and virgin martyr; George, soldier and martyr; and Vincent of Spain with his gridiron and on the other side Catherine of Alexandria with her wheel; Polycarp; Lawrence; and Alban the Roman soldier who was the first British martyr. Polycarp wears the full Eucharistic robes of a Bishop- chasuble, dalmatic and tunicle.

In the lower niches are the twelve apostles, the founders of the Christian Church. On the far left hand side we have Philip, with Latin cross; Jude; James the Less; Matthew with his book; James the Great with his pilgrim hat and staff; Peter with his keys; John with the chalice of the last supper; Andrew with diagonal cross; Bartholomew with knife; then Simon; Thomas; and Matthias. Then in the lowest niches of the central pillars we have the four Evangelists, St Matthew, St Mark, St Luke and St John.

Westminster Abbey
In 1888 Hitch carved heraldic animals to staircase, carved statues, and other general carving.

On the exterior of the north transept of Westminster Abbey and as part of John Loughborough Pearson’s work at the abbey between 1888 and 1889 Hitch carved twenty-eight statues. These were of St Raphael, St Uriel, St Michael, St Gabriel, St Alban, St Aidan, Venerable Bede, Archbishop Theodore, St Augustine, Paulinus, St Benedict, St Dunstan, Roger Bacon, Robert Grosseteste, St Boniface, St Edmund, Matthew of Westminster, William Caxton, Walsinus, Edwin, King Richard, Anne of Bohemia, King Henry V, Catherine of Valois, Abbot Ware, Abbot Littleton, Dean Goodman and Williams the Lord Keeper. In 1890 he carved statues to the north transept.

Works for Lord Astor

Two Temple Place
When Lord Astor commissioned John Loughborough Pearson to design Two Temple Place on the Embankment, Hitch was brought in to carve all the external embellishments to the stonework, except for those above the porch and for the interior carried out several commissions including the relief portraits in the Main Hall. Below is one of Hitch’s external carvings and then one of the relief portraits, this of Shakespeare's Juliet. Hitch also carved some very ornate bench-ends and a photograph of one of these is shown below as it highlights Hitch’s prowess as a wood carver. See Two Temple Place

Octagan Temple family chapel, Cliveden
Lord Astor also commissioned a triptych altarpiece for the family chapel within the Octagon Temple at Cliveden. This was executed in the late 1890s. Frank Pearson was the supervising architect and Hitch carried out the carving. The whole altarpiece is uniformly gilded, with cabuchons of semi-precious stones in the frames. The subject is the Adoration and the two wings of the triptych feature more attendant merchants or possibly shepherds. The central panel is topped by carved angels and a central finial representing the Lamb, all gilded. The altarpiece is set on a base with three more reliefs of angels bearing shields of arms: a double panel flanked by single outer panels. The creation of the chapel and the conversion it involved of Leoni's Octagon Temple of 1735, may be attributed to the death in 1894 of Astor’s wife Mary, only a year after his purchase of the estate. The chapel is in the lower room with the floor removed above to create a small domed octagonal chapel. The first, second and third Viscounts Astor are buried there, with red marble commemorative slabs in the floor which is of Opus Alexandrinum.

Other works
Hitch worked with several architects who used him to carve altarpieces, church furniture and other decorative features on churches they were commissioned to design. During his career he worked with many architects, most notably John Loughborough Pearson, who provided Hitch with most of his commissions. His association with Pearson spanned at least the period between 1880 and 1912. Hitch also worked with William Doulas Caröe, a student of Pearson, as well as H. Fuller Clark, T.H. Lyon, Burke Downing and Paul Waterhouse.

The following are lists of additional works by Hitch, although it is not a complete listing.

Churches, cathedrals and other buildings

War memorials

Other types of works

Gallery of additional images

Bibliography
 Leeds Museums & Galleries
 Photograph album of the sculpture of Nathaniel Hitch and others c. 1890–1930. Reference 1999.1.
 Photograph albums of the sculpture of Nathaniel Hitch and Frederick Brook Hitch c. 1870–1957. Reference 2004.26
 Three lists of works executed by Nathaniel Hitch between 1885 and 1930 n.d. [1885–1930]. Reference 2009.21.
 Printed list of works by Nathaniel Hitch n.d. [c. 1899]. Reference 2009.21/1.
 Photocopy of abridged supplementary list of work by Nathaniel Hitch n.d. [c1930]. Reference 2009.21/2.
 Photocopy of abridged supplementary list of work by Nathaniel Hitch n.d. [c. 1925]. Reference 2009.21/3.

Notes

References 

 

Works by English people